Íñigo Urkullu Renteria (born 18 September 1961) is a Basque politician, and the Lehendakari (President) of the Basque Government since 2012.

As the President of the Basque Government, he headed the First, Second and Third Urkullu Governments of the Basque Autonomous Community (Spain).

Biography
Urkullu graduated in teaching, specialized in Basque language, from the University of Deusto. He was a secondary school teacher at Asti-Leku Ikastola school.

Political career 
He was the Basque Nationalist Party (PNV) chairman from 2008 to 2013 when he was succeeded by Andoni Ortuzar, since the party's rules do not allow a Lehendakari to be the party's chairman at the same time.

He was the Biscay leader of the party from 2004 to 2008 and has been a member since 1996. He was the director of the Department for Youth and Social Services of the Biscay Foral Government (Diputación Foral de Bizkaia) from 1987 to 1994 and served in the Basque Parliament from 1984 to 1987 and from 1994 to 2005 (during the 2nd, 3rd, 5th, 6th, 7th and 8th sittings of the parliament).

Amid the 2017-18 Spanish constitutional crisis, Urkullu tried to mediate between the Spanish and Catalan governments to avoid the declaration of independence and the application of Article 155, but these attempts failed. He declared as a witness in the Trial of Catalonia independence leaders on 28 February 2019.

He resides in Ajuria Enea, the official residence of the president of the Basque Government.

References

1961 births
Living people
Presidents of the Basque Government
People from Alonsotegi
Members of the 11th Basque Parliament
Basque Nationalist Party politicians
Leaders of political parties in Spain
University of Deusto alumni
Members of the 12th Basque Parliament
Members of the 10th Basque Parliament
Members of the 7th Basque Parliament
Members of the 8th Basque Parliament
Members of the 6th Basque Parliament
Members of the 5th Basque Parliament